Cycling has been contested at the Pan American Games since the inaugural games in, 1951, without ever leaving the program.

The next edition of the games will take place in 2019 in Lima, Peru. 22 medal events are scheduled to be contested, four in BMX, two in mountain biking and four in road cycling and 12 in track cycling. A total of 250 cyclists will qualify to compete at the games.

In 2016, the International Olympic Committee (IOC) made several changes to its sports program, which were subsequently implemented for these games. Included in this was the addition of BMX freestyle events for the first time to the Pan American Games sports program. Also added was the addition of the Madison event in track cycling event for men and women.

Current events

Road cycling

Men's road race
The individual road race has been run every time since 1951.

Women's road race
The individual road race has been run every time since 1987.

Men's time trial
The individual road race has been run every time since 1951.

Women's time trial
The individual time trial was introduced in 1995, and has been run ever since.

Track cycling

Men's Keirin

Women's Keirin

Men's omnium

Women's omnium

Mountain biking

Men's cross-country
The Mountain biking was introduced in 1995.

Women's cross-country
The Mountain biking was introduced in 1995.

BMX

Men's BMX racing
The BMX was introduced in 2007.

Women's BMX racing
The BMX was introduced in 2007.

BMX freestyle

Men's BMX freestyle
The BMX freestyle was introduced in 2019.

Women's BMX freestyle
The BMX freestyle was introduced in 2019.

All-time medal table

Road cycling

Track cycling

Mountain biking

BMX racing

BMX freestyle

Combined total
Updated until 2019 Pan American Games

References

 
Sports at the Pan American Games
Pan American Games
Cycle racing in North America
Cycle racing in South America